Yabsley is an English-language toponymic surname. Notable people with the surname include:

 Jack Yabsley (born 1985), Australian television presenter
 Lorna Yabsley (born 1964), British actress
 Michael Yabsley (born 1956), Australian politician
 William Yabsley (1812–1880), Australian shipwright

References 

English-language surnames
English toponymic surnames